As of 2015, Malay has at least four translations available of the Tirukkural.

History of translations
In 1964, Ramily Bin Thakir translated the Kural text in verse. In 1967, Hussein Ismail translated the work under the title Thirukural Sastera Kalasik Tamil Yang. In 1978, G. Soosai's translation appeared under the title Thirukkural dalam bahasa Melayu. The fourth translation appeared in 2013 by Singaravelu Sacchidhanandham.

Translations

See also
 Tirukkural translations
 List of Tirukkural translations by language

References

External links
 

Malay
Translations into Malay